The Clown or The Clowns may refer to:

Books
 The Clown (novel), a 1963 novel by Heinrich Böll
 The Clown (short story), by Thomas Mann
 The Clown (2000 AD), a series from the comic 2000 AD

Film and TV
 The Clown (1916 film), a 1916 silent film directed by William C. deMille and starring Victor Moore
 The Clown (1931 film). a 1931 short animated film
 The Clown (1953 film), starring Red Skelton
 The Clown (1976 film), a 1976 West German film directed by Vojtěch Jasný
 The Clown (2011 film), a 2011 Brazilian film
 The Clowns (film), a 1970 film directed by Federico Fellini
 Der Clown, a German television series

Music
 The Clown (album), a 1957 album by Charles Mingus
 "The Clown", 1969 song by Status Quo from Spare Parts
 "The Clown", 1977 song by BZN
 "The Clown" (Conway Twitty song), 1982
 Clowns (band), an Australian punk rock band, formed in 2009

See also 
 Clown (disambiguation)